The 1945 Philadelphia Eagles season was their 13th in the league. The team failed to improve on their previous output of 7–1–2, losing three games. The team failed to qualify for the playoffs for the 13th consecutive season.

Offseason

NFL Draft 
The 1945 NFL Draft was held on April 8, 1945. It was the last draft held in Chicago; later in the year the league moved its offices to Philadelphia. It would be 32 rounds with the Eagles getting picks in 30 of them. The Eagles would pick 9th in the rounds.

The teams with the 5 worse records in 1944 season would be the only teams picking in rounds 2 and 4.

Future Hall of Famers in this draft included Charley Trippi, Halfback from Georgia taken 1st round 1st overall by the Chicago Cardinals.
Elroy "Crazylegs" Hirsch, Wide receiver from Michigan taken 5th overall by the Cleveland Rams.
Pete Pihos, Defensive end from Indiana University,
Tom Fears, End from UCLA, and
Arnie Weinmeister, Defensive tackle from Washington

Player selections 
The table shows the Eagles selections and what picks they had that were traded away and the team that ended up with that pick. It is possible the Eagles' pick ended up with this team via another team that the Eagles made a trade with.
Not shown are acquired picks that the Eagles traded away.

Game recaps

Standings

Roster 
(All time List of Philadelphia Eagles players in franchise history)

References 

Philadelphia Eagles seasons
Philadelphia Eagles
Philadelphia